Abdirashid Duale is a multi-millionaire Somali entrepreneur. He is the CEO of Dahabshiil, an international funds transfer company.

Biography

Duale was born in Burao, Somaliland and belongs to Isaaq. He joined his father in the funds transfer business prior to the outbreak of civil strife, in which he and his father lost everything. Through their network of contacts, they rebuilt their business into one of the largest international money transfer companies in the Horn of Africa. He is a father of eight children.

Dahabshiil
Duale took over the company after his father retired, and began expanding Dahabshiil's reach into new markets. Today, the billionaire CEO's company Dahabshiil employs more than 2000 people worldwide, has offices in London and Dubai, and provides financial services to international organizations as well as to businesses and private individuals.

References 

British businesspeople
Somaliland people
Living people
Somalilander Sunni Muslims
British Sunni Muslims
Somalian emigrants to the United Kingdom
People from Burao
1964 births